The Kashmir division is a revenue and administrative division of the Indian-administered Jammu and Kashmir. It comprises the Kashmir Valley, bordering the Jammu Division to the south and Ladakh to the east. The Line of Control forms its boundary with the Pakistani-administered territories of Gilgit−Baltistan and Azad Jammu and Kashmir to the north and west and west, respectively.

Its main city is Srinagar. Other important cities include :Anantnag, :Baramulla, :Sopore and Kulgam.

Districts
The Indian administrative districts for the Kashmir Valley were reorganised in 1968, and 2006, each time subdividing existing districts. Kashmir Division currently consists of the following ten districts:

Demographics

Religion

The Kashmir division is largely Muslim (96.41%) with a small Hindu (2.45%) and Sikh (0.81%) population. Among Muslims, about 10% are Shias, remaining being Sunni. Majority of the population is made up of ethnic Kashmiris, with a significant minority of Gujjars and Bakarwals.

Language
The majority of the population speaks Kashmiri (85.50%), while the remainder speaks either Gujari, Pahari or Hindi.

Urdu is also widely understood as a literary language in Kashmir due to it being a medium of instruction in schools.

References

External links
 Kashmir Division Administration
 Kashmir Divisional Commissioner on Facebook

States and union territories of India
Jammu and Kashmir
 
Divisions of Jammu and Kashmir